Rang Panchami (literally colour on the fifth) is a Hindu festival celebrated on Phalguna Krushnapaksha Panchami, that is the fifth day of the second fortnight of the month of Phalguna. 

During Ranga Panchami, people sprinkle or smear colored powder or gulal on each other, similar to Holi. However, unlike Holi, on Ranga Panchami, people also splash colored water on each other. The word "Ranga" means color, and "Panchami" refers to the fifth day in the Hindu calendar. 

The festival is believed to have originated in Maharashtra and is also known as Shimga or Shimgo. In some places, people make small processions carrying an image of the deity, and the procession ends with the immersion of the deity in a nearby river or pond.

Ranga Panchami is a popular festival in Madhya Pradesh, Maharashtra and Karnataka . It is celebrated with enthusiasm and joy. However, it is worth noting that in recent years, concerns have been raised about the excessive use of chemical colors during the festival, which can cause harm to people's health and the environment.

Description
The history of Ranga Panchami is not well documented, and its origins are not entirely clear. However, it is believed that the festival has its roots in ancient Hindu traditions and may have been celebrated for thousands of years.

One theory is that Ranga Panchami was initially celebrated as a way to welcome spring and the new crop season. The festival is said to have been a time for farmers to celebrate the end of the winter and the beginning of the spring season when they could sow their crops.

Another theory suggests that Ranga Panchami was a way to celebrate the victory of good over evil. According to this theory, the festival was celebrated to commemorate the defeat of the demon king Hiranyakashipu by the Hindu god Vishnu.

Regardless of its origins, Ranga Panchami has become an important part of the cultural and social fabric of Madhya Pradesh & Maharashtra and other parts of India where it is celebrated. It is a time for people to come together and celebrate with friends and family, exchange sweets and gifts, and enjoy the festive atmosphere.

In addition to the color-playing, Hindus also observe Rang Panchami as a day of worship. They offer prayers to Lord Krishna and Goddess Radha to honor their divine love and union. Puja rituals are performed to seek blessings and guidance from these deities.

See also 

 Hindus 
 Hinduism 
 List of Hindu festivals in Maharashtra

References

Hindu festivals
Holi
March observances
Religious festivals in India